Danea Juanita Panta Vargas (born March 26, 1991) is a Peruvian model who represented Peru at the Miss International 2016 pageant.

She won the only edition of Peru’s Next Top Model in 2013.

She also won Miss Emerald Pageant 2020 in July this year. 

Currently she lives in London where she is working with Premier Model Management a very top agency that represents top models like Linda Evangelista and Naomi Campbell.

Early life
She studied law school in her native Trujillo. She is the winner of the first Peru's Next Top Model in 2013. At the age of 22, she was the first top model from Peru and traveled to Miami to sign a contract with the MP Mega Miami agency, in addition to winning contracts with Saga Falabella, L'Bel and Pantene. In 2015, she appeared to be a conductor on channel E!.

In 2010, she was the host of a medical program called Consultorio en Casa, issued by the SolTV channel and the "Como en casa" program. In 2012 she participated singing in the Yo Soy program.

Miss Peru 2016 and Miss International 2016
In 2016 she participated in Miss Peru, being in third place obtaining the title of Miss Peru International, earning the right to participate in the Miss International contest. She currently lives in London and has starred in campaigns for important brands such as Pond's, NastyGal, Chi chi London, Miss Guided and others.

References

External links
 

1991 births
Living people
People from Trujillo, Peru
Peruvian female models
Peruvian emigrants to the United States
Peruvian television presenters
Miss International 2016 delegates
Peruvian beauty pageant winners
Peruvian women television presenters